Miguel Ángel Santoro (born 27 February 1942) is a retired Argentine football goalkeeper. He played most of his career for Club Atlético Independiente and represented the Argentina national football team at the 1974 World Cup.

Playing career

Santoro was born in Sarandí, Argentina.  He made 343 appearances for Independiente between 1962 and 1974, making him the goalkeeper with the highest number of appearances for the club. During his time with Independiente he won 10 titles, 4 league, 4 Copa Libertadores, the Copa Intercontinental and the Copa Interamericana.

After representing Argentina at the 1974 World Cup Santoro was sold to Spanish side Hércules CF where he played until his retirement in 1977.

Managerial career

Santoro has had three short spells as manager of Independiente, his record as manager of the first team is Played 36, Won 12, Drawn 14, Lost 10.

He joined Independiente on 5 October 2008 and stepped down as manager of Independiente
on 22 March 2009.

Honours

Club
 Independiente
Primera División Argentina: 1963, Nacional 1967, Metropolitano 1970, Metropolitano 1971
Copa Libertadores: 1964, 1965, 1972, 1973 
Intercontinental Cup: 1973
Copa Interamericana: 1973

External links

player profile on the Independiente website 

1942 births
Living people
Sportspeople from Avellaneda
Argentine footballers
Association football goalkeepers
Argentine Primera División players
Club Atlético Independiente footballers
Hércules CF players
Copa Libertadores-winning players
Argentina international footballers
1974 FIFA World Cup players
La Liga players
Argentine expatriate sportspeople in Spain
Argentine football managers
Club Atlético Independiente managers